Shawnee State Park is a  public recreation area surrounded by the  Shawnee State Forest in Scioto County, Ohio, United States. The park is in the foothills of the Appalachian Mountains near the Ohio River in Southern Ohio on State Route 125, just north of Friendship.

History
The area was once a hunting ground for the Shawnee Indians. The park was first opened in 1922 as Theodore Roosevelt State Game Preserve. The game preserve saw further development and improvements by the Civilian Conservation Corps in the 1930s. The area became a state park and forest following creation of the Ohio Department of Natural Resources and the Division of Parks and Recreation in 1949.

Activities and amenities
The park's recreational activities include golf, fishing, swimming, hiking, and boating on Roosevelt Lake and Turkey Creek Lake. The state park marina on the Ohio River is located on US 52 just west of Friendship. The park's golf course was closed in 2019.

Gallery

References

External links

Shawnee State Park Ohio Department of Natural Resources 
Shawnee State Park Map Ohio Department of Natural Resources

State parks of Ohio
Protected areas of Scioto County, Ohio
Protected areas established in 1922
1922 establishments in Ohio
Civilian Conservation Corps in Ohio
Nature centers in Ohio